Thomas Musgrave may refer to:

 Thomas Moore Musgrave (1774–1854), British postmaster of Bath and translator
 Thomas Musgrave (academic), 16th-century English physician and academic
 Thomas Musgrave of Bewcastle, 16th-century English soldier and border official
 Thomas Musgrave (bishop) (1788–1860), British Archbishop of York
 Thomas Musgrave (castaway) (1832–1891), Australian ship's captain and castaway
 Thomas Musgrave (priest) (died 1686), Dean of Carlisle
 Thomas Cebern Musgrave Jr. (1913–2005), US Air Force officer
 Sir Thomas Musgrave, 7th Baronet (1737–1812), English general
 Thomas Musgrave (MP) for Appleby